John George Robinson CBE, (30 July 1856 – 7 December 1943) was an English railway engineer, and was chief mechanical engineer of the Great Central Railway from 1900 to 1922.

Early life
Born at Newcastle upon Tyne, the second son of Matthew Robinson, a locomotive engineer, and his wife Jane, Robinson was educated at the Chester Grammar School, and in 1872 commenced an engineering apprenticeship with the Great Western Railway at Swindon Works, as a pupil of Joseph Armstrong. In 1878 he became assistant to his father Matthew Robinson at Bristol, and in 1884 joined the Waterford and Limerick Railway (which became the Waterford, Limerick and Western Railway in 1896) as their locomotive, carriage and wagon assistant superintendent. He was promoted to superintendent the following year.

Great Central Railway

In 1900 Robinson joined the Great Central Railway as locomotive and marine superintendent and in 1902 was appointed chief mechanical engineer. He remained in that post until 1922, when prior to the Great Central's grouping into the London and North Eastern Railway he declined the post of chief mechanical engineer of the LNER, choosing instead to step aside for the younger Nigel Gresley. Robinson was awarded a CBE in 1920.

Robinson's first passenger locomotive design for the GCR was Class 11B (LNER Class D9) 4-4-0, of which 40 were built between 1901 and 1904, the last being withdrawn by British Railways in 1950. Robinson followed in 1913 with the larger Class 11E (LNER D10) "Director" Class 4-4-0 locomotive, which was used on GCR express trains from London Marylebone to Sheffield Victoria and Manchester London Road. Ten were built, followed by eleven "Improved Director" (GCR Class 11F, LNER Class D11) locomotives during 1920–1924.

Robinson's famous GCR Class 8K 2-8-0 heavy freight locomotive was introduced in 1911 and many more were built for the Railway Operating Division of the Royal Engineers in 1917. Some of these reliable locomotives, of which over 400 were built, remained in service with the LNER and later British Railways until 1966.

Locomotive classes credited to Robinson

Waterford and Limerick Railway

Great Central Railway

Preserved Robinson locomotives

Two Robinson-designed locomotives are preserved in the UK:
 4-4-0 Improved Director GCR Class 11F No. 506 Butler–Henderson (Later BR No. 62660), which is preserved at the National Railway Museum, York, and currently on display at Barrow Hill Roundhouse, near Chesterfield, Derbyshire
 2-8-0 GCR Class 8K No. 102 (Later BR No. 63601), also owned by the National Railway Museum is on loan to the Great Central Railway (preserved) at Loughborough. It is currently (2008) operational and used on demonstration goods trains.
Three Robinson-designed locomotives are preserved in Australia
 2-8-0 ROD ROD 1984 (later J & A Brown No. 20) preserved by the Dorrigo Steam Railway and Museum
 2-8-0 ROD ROD 2003 (later J & A Brown No. 24) this loco was actually built by the GCR at Gorton Works and is preserved by the Dorrigo Steam Railway and Museum
 2-8-0 ROD ROD 2004 (later J & A Brown No. 23) this loco was actually built by the GCR at Gorton Works and is preserved by the Richmond Vale Railway Museum

References
Notes

Bibliography

Oxford Dictionary of National Biography: Robinson, John George by George W. Carpenter

External links
Robinson 2-8-0
 John G. Robinson at www.lner.info
 http://www.steamindex.com/people/robinson.htm

1856 births
1943 deaths
Commanders of the Order of the British Empire
Locomotive builders and designers
English railway mechanical engineers
Great Central Railway people
People educated at Chester City Grammar School